Maestro is an upcoming American biographical drama film directed by Bradley Cooper and produced by Martin Scorsese, Steven Spielberg, and Todd Phillips, as well as Cooper, from a screenplay he co-wrote with Josh Singer. It is based on the life of Leonard Bernstein, who worked as a conductor, composer, pianist, music educator, author, and humanitarian. The film stars Cooper as Bernstein, Carey Mulligan, Jeremy Strong, Matt Bomer, Maya Hawke, and Sarah Silverman. 

Maestro is scheduled to be released in 2023, by Netflix.

Premise
A biopic about the life of Leonard Bernstein, with a focus on his marriage to Felicia Montealegre.

Cast
 Bradley Cooper as Leonard Bernstein
 Carey Mulligan as Felicia Montealegre
 Jeremy Strong as John Gruen
 Matt Bomer
 Maya Hawke as Jamie Bernstein
 Sarah Silverman as Shirley Bernstein
 Michael Urie as Jerome Robbins
 Gideon Glick as Tommy Cothran
 Sam Nivola as Alexander Bernstein

Production

Development
The project had been in development at Paramount Pictures, with Martin Scorsese initially planning to direct the film. He would step down as director to work on The Irishman, allowing Bradley Cooper to join the film in May 2018 as director and to star as Bernstein. Scorsese will produce alongside Todd Phillips and Steven Spielberg. Spielberg was also initially considering directing the film, and had approached Cooper to star but offered the director position to Cooper after a screening of A Star Is Born. In January 2020, the project was moved to Netflix, with filming initially expected to begin in 2021.

Casting
In September 2020, the project was given the title Maestro with Carey Mulligan joining the cast. It was also announced that filming would begin in the spring of 2021. In October, Jeremy Strong joined the cast as John Gruen. In March 2022, Matt Bomer joined the cast. Bomer would be confirmed in April, with Maya Hawke also announced as being cast. In June, Sarah Silverman was cast as Bernstein's sister Shirley. In February 2023, Michael Urie was announced to be appearing in the film as Jerome Robbins.

Filming
The film was initially expect to begin filming on April 5, 2021 in Los Angeles, however it instead began in May 2022. Production occurred at Tanglewood between May 21 and 26, and in New York City. Filming also took place over three days at Ely Cathedral in England, between October 20 and 22.

Criticism of Cooper's appearance
Cooper's use of a prosthetic nose to portray Bernstein has been criticized by some social media users as an anti-Semitic caricature. James Hirsh wrote in the Canadian Jewish News, “there's no reason to believe that the decision to wear a fake nose is a deliberately antisemitic act [...]  a number of Jews are involved in the production. And the prosthesis arguably helps with the resemblance," but acknowledged that Cooper is not Jewish and has not used prosthetics to portray other characters or real-life individuals such as Joseph Merrick or Chris Kyle. Others said a Jewish actor of equal fame such as Jake Gyllenhaal should have been cast in his place.

References

External links
 

Amblin Entertainment films
American biographical drama films
American films based on actual events
Biographical films about musicians
Drama films based on actual events
Casting controversies in film
Films about marriage
Films directed by Bradley Cooper
Films produced by Bradley Cooper
Films produced by Todd Phillips
Films produced by Martin Scorsese
Films produced by Steven Spielberg
Films set in the 20th century
Films shot in Massachusetts
Films shot in Los Angeles
Films shot in New York City
Upcoming English-language films
Upcoming films
Upcoming Netflix original films
2020s American films